Anticla is a genus of moths of the Bombycidae family.

Species
 Anticla antica Walker, 1855
 Anticla flavaria Cramer, 1781
 Anticla limosa Schaus, 1892
 Anticla ortygia Druce, 1887
 Anticla rutila (Druce, 1887)
 Anticla symphora Schaus, 1929
 Anticla tarasia Schaus, 1929

References

Bombycidae